Karolína Plíšková was the defending champion, but lost in the semifinals to Dominika Cibulková.

Donna Vekić won her first WTA title, defeating Cibulková in the final, 5–7, 7–5, 7–6(7–4).

Seeds

 Dominika Cibulková (final)
 Zhang Shuai (semifinals)
 Karolína Plíšková (semifinals)
 Patricia Mayr-Achleitner (quarterfinals)
 Kimiko Date-Krumm (first round, retired)
 Zarina Diyas (quarterfinals)
 Donna Vekić (champion)
 Ayumi Morita (first round)

Draw

Finals

Top half

Bottom half

Qualifying

Seeds

  Eri Hozumi (qualified)
  Erika Sema (qualifying competition)
  Duan Yingying (qualified)
  Lyudmyla Kichenok (qualified)
  Pemra Özgen (qualified)
  Ana Vrljić (qualified)
  Yurika Sema (first round)
  Samantha Murray (first round)
  Wang Qiang (qualifying competition)
  Giulia Gatto-Monticone (qualified)
  Arina Rodionova (qualifying competition)
  Miharu Imanishi (qualifying competition)

Qualifiers

  Eri Hozumi
  Giulia Gatto-Monticone
  Duan Yingying
  Lyudmyla Kichenok
  Pemra Özgen
  Ana Vrljić

Qualifying draw

First qualifier

Second qualifier

Third qualifier

Fourth qualifier

Fifth qualifier

Sixth qualifier

References
Main Draw
Qualifying Draw

Malaysian Open
Malaysian Open (tennis)